Dudley & Stourbridge Harriers is an athletics club founded in 1924. Originally established as Dudley Harriers, it took on its current name through the amalgamation with Stourbridge, Wordsley and District Harriers.

The Dell Stadium has been the home of training and competition for the club since its opening in 1964.


History 
The history of many athletics clubs within the Midlands can trace their history back to Birchfield Harriers. Prior to 1924 athletics clubs could have multiple branches across a region. On September 24, 1910, at the Annual General Meeting of the Birchfield Harriers Tipton branch, Tipton Harriers became independent.

As their membership grew club branches were founded at Wolverhampton, Dudley, Wednesbury and Cradley Heath. In 1924 the M.C.A.A.A banned the practice of having club branches. The Dudley branch formed the Dudley Harriers & A C.

Dudley Harriers & A.C 
The newly formed club set up headquarters at the Gipsies Tent Inn, Steppingstone Street. A representative of Dudley Harriers attended the April 1925 meeting to form the Birmingham & District Invitation Cross Country League.

Stourbridge, Wordsley and District Harriers 
Stourbridge were invited to the Birmingham Cross Country League on September 21, 1931.

Dudley & Stourbridge Harriers 
Dudley Harriers and Stourbridge, Wordsley and District Harriers agreed to amalgamate into the present club in 1963.

DASH was a founding member of the Youth Athletics Cross Country League in 1975.

Competition Results

References

Stourbridge
Athletics clubs in England